Şeref Has (27 September 1936 – 13 June 2019) was the third most capped Turkish football player in Fenerbahçe football history with 605 appearances. He played as a forward and midfielder and was especially known for his headed goals. At his career end he also played as defender.

Professional career
Has transferred to Fenerbahçe from Beyoğluspor in 1955. He was one of the fan favourites when he was playing. He played for Fenerbahçe between 1955–69, scoring 168 goals. He won the Turkish League 4 times and the Istanbul League title twice.

International career
Has played 37 times for Turkey, starting as captain 10 times.

Personal life
Has' brother, Mehmet Ali Has, was also a Turkish professional footballer.

References

External links

 
 

1936 births
2019 deaths
Footballers from Istanbul
Turkish footballers
Turkey international footballers
Turkey youth international footballers
Beyoğlu SK footballers
Fenerbahçe S.K. footballers
Mersin İdman Yurdu footballers
Süper Lig players
Association football midfielders